Lance Koro Hohaia (born 1 April 1983), also known by the nickname of "The Huntly Hurricane", is a New Zealand former professional rugby league footballer. A New Zealand international representative utility back, he played in the NRL for the New Zealand Warriors and the Super League for St Helens, with whom he won the 2014 Super League championship. In 2008 Hohaia was a member of the World Cup winning New Zealand team.

Early years
Hohaia was born in Hamilton on New Zealand's North Island, but grew up in the town of Huntly, where he started to play for Huntly South Rugby League Club at the age of six, in 1989. The following year, he joined Taniwharau Rugby League Club.

Hohaia attended Huntly Primary, and Southwell School and St Paul's Collegiate School, both in Hamilton. Rugby union was the winter sport at Southwell, and at St Paul's, Hohaia played union for the school on Saturdays and league for Taniwharau on Sundays. He played his first senior game for Taniwharau in 2001, aged 17. Hohaia represented Waikato in 2001 and was also selected for the Northern Districts side that lost to the touring French side. After six Premier Division games for Taniwharau, he signed for Manurewa Marlins.

Playing career

National Rugby League
Lance was signed by the New Zealand Warriors and he moved up to Auckland. He made his début in Round 4 2002 against the North Queensland Cowboys. Hohaia played for the Warriors from the interchange bench in their 2002 NRL Grand Final loss to the Sydney Roosters. Hohaia also made his international début for the Kiwis in 2002.

Hohaia had great utility value and was often used by the Warriors at dummy half. However this utility value worked against Lance, as he struggled to claim a regular starting spot in the Warriors lineup and was often in and out of the team. When not selected by the first grade side he has played for the Manurewa Marlins, Waicoa Bay Stallions and Auckland Vulcans in the Bartercard Cup and NSWRL Premier League.

In 2007 Hohaia spent most of the season at centre, due to injuries to the outside backs. However, in 2007 he was again selected for the Kiwis, this time for their tour of Great Britain. At the end of the season the Catalans Dragons were rumored to be interested in signing Hohaia to replace the retiring Stacey Jones, however Hohaia ultimately stayed with the Warriors.
 
In 2008, Hohaia took over the fullback role from the injured Wade McKinnon. In August 2008, Hohaia was named in the New Zealand training squad for the 2008 Rugby League World Cup. Hohaia was promising in McKinnon's absence leaving a dispute whether he should be played at fullback for the 2008 preliminary final. In October 2008, he was named in the final 24-man Kiwi squad. He played at fullback in every one of New Zealand's matches, including their victory in the final.

In 2009, Hohaia was injured in the first game of the season against the Eels, He made his comeback in round 5 against the Roosters where he played fullback in Wade McKinnon's absence. Hohaia was named at fullback in the mid season ANZAC Test against the Kangaroos. He also was selected for the Kiwis 24 man squad for the Four Nations tournament in Europe. He was selected to play fullback against both Tonga and Australia and won the man of the match award in the test vs Australia. In the Four Nations tournament, he appeared at fullback during most of the games and was one of the Kiwis' best players in the tournament. His efforts earned him a try against Australia and a double against France; one of which was a one hundred metre dash.

In 2010, Hohaia became the first-choice fullback ahead of Wade McKinnon. He played his 150th first grade game for the club. On 12 April 2011, it was announced that Hohaia had signed a 4-year contract with Super League club, St. Helens from 2012.

Super League
Whilst playing for English club St. Helens, Hohaia was selected to play for the Exiles against England in the first game of the 2012 International Origin series.

St. Helens reached the 2014 Super League Grand Final and Hohaia was selected to play at stand-off. He was punched unconscious by Ben Flower in the first few minutes of the match and had to leave the field for the remainder of the 14–6 victory over the Wigan Warriors at Old Trafford.

He retired from rugby on 29 April 2015 because of recurrent concussion symptoms. Post retirement from rugby he moved to Michigan.

Legacy
In 2015, he was named as Taniwharau's best player of their first 70 years.

Coaching
On 30 April 2021, it was announced that he had taken the head coach role of new US club Austin Armadillos in the inaugural season of the North American Rugby League for 2021.

References

External links

NZ Warriors Profile
Saints Heritage Society profile

1983 births
Living people
Austin Armadillos coaches
Auckland rugby league team players
Exiles rugby league team players
Manurewa Marlins players
New Zealand Māori rugby league players
New Zealand national rugby league team players
New Zealand rugby league coaches
New Zealand rugby league players
New Zealand expatriate sportspeople in England
New Zealand Warriors players
Northern Districts rugby league team players
People educated at St Paul's Collegiate School
Rugby league five-eighths
Rugby league fullbacks
Rugby league halfbacks
Rugby league utility players
Rugby league players from Hamilton, New Zealand
St Helens R.F.C. players
Taniwharau Rugby League Club players
Waicoa Bay Stallions players
Waikato rugby league team players